Municipality elections were held in Norway in 1922.

Result of municipal elections
Results of the 1922 municipal elections. Results can only be given separately by rural areas and cities.

Cities

Rural areas

References

Local elections in Norway
1920s elections in Norway
Norway
Local